The Kościelski Award is an independent Polish literary award, awarded since 1962 by the Geneva-based Kościelski Foundation. The jury issues annual awards to "promising writers" 40 years of age or younger. 

Past winners have included Sławomir Mrożek, Zbigniew Herbert, Alicja Iwańska, Bolesław Taborski, Adam Zagajewski, Wojciech Karpiński, Jarosław Marek Rymkiewicz, Stefan Chwin, Jerzy Pilch, Paweł Huelle, Andrzej Stasiuk, Olga Tokarczuk, Tomasz Różycki, Jacek Dehnel, Maciej Płaza, Jolanta Stefko, Mikołaj Łoziński and most recently Jacek Dukaj. This is the second oldest independent award in Polish literature after the Award of the Union of Polish Writers Abroad that was established in London in 1951.

See also
List of literary prizes

References

Awards established in 1962
Polish literary awards
Literary awards honouring young writers